Sufi Observing Competition is an  international competition and like Messier marathon, but more difficult with various subjects.

Since 2006, Astronomical Society of Iran – Amateur Committee (ASIAC) holds an international observing competition in the memory of Azophi. The first competition was held in 2006 in the north of Semnan Province and the 2nd SUFI observing competition was held in summer of 2008 in Ladiz near Zahedan. More than 100 observers from Iran and Iraq participated in this event.

Third Sufi Competition was held in Pasargadae, Fars province of Iran, at the enclosure of the historical tomb of Cyrus the Great on 17–20 August 2009. More than 120 amateur astronomers participated in this competition which held in 2 class of individuals and groups. Closing ceremony of 3rd Sufi Competition was held in Persepolis historical site splendidly which is in the list of UNESCO World Heritage Site.

Babak Amin Tafreshi, Pouria Nazemi, Kazem Kookaram and Mohammad H. Almasi are Iranian amateur astronomers who designed and manage this competition in their country until today.

Objects selected by the competition

See also
Abd al-Rahman al-Sufi
Messier marathon
Star party

References

External links
official weblog for SUFI Observing competition
Astronomical Society of Iran – Amateur Committee (ASIAC)
Time-lapse video of the Sufi Competition on The World at Night

Amateur astronomy
Observational astronomy